The 2002 FIBA Europe Under-20 Championship (known at that time as 2002 European Championship for Young Men) was the sixth edition of the FIBA Europe Under-20 Championship. The cities of Kaunas, Alytus and Vilnius, in Lithuania, hosted the tournament. Greece won their first title.

Teams

Squads

Qualification

Preliminary round
The twelve teams were allocated in two groups of six teams each.

Group A

Group B

Knockout stage

9th–12th playoffs

Championship

5th–8th playoffs

Final standings

References
FIBA Archive
FIBA Europe Archive

FIBA U20 European Championship
2002–03 in European basketball
2002–03 in Lithuanian basketball
International youth basketball competitions hosted by Lithuania
Sports competitions in Alytus
Sports competitions in Kaunas
July 2002 sports events in Europe
August 2002 sports events in Europe
Sports competitions in Vilnius